The R730 road is a regional road in County Wexford, Ireland. From its junction with the R702 in Kiltealy it takes a southeasterly route to its junction with the R741 in the centre of Wexford Town, continuing south to Blackhorse to its junction on a roundabout with the N25 Wexford bypass. En route it crosses the N30 national primary road.

The road has subsumed short sections of the N11 and N25 which formerly passed through Wexford Town, prior to the opening of the Wexford bypass. This section of the road also formed part of the former Trunk Road, T8.

See also
Roads in Ireland
Motorways in the Republic of Ireland
National primary road
National secondary road
Trunk Roads in Ireland
Road signs in the Republic of Ireland

References
Roads Act 1993 (Classification of Regional Roads) Order 2006 – Department of Transport

Regional roads in the Republic of Ireland
Roads in County Wexford